Polyptychus distensus is a moth of the  family Sphingidae. It is known from Gabon.

References

Polyptychus
Moths described in 1990